Étoile Sportive Saint-Michel Le Portel Côte d'Opale, commonly known as ESSM Le Portel or simply Le Portel, is a professional basketball team based in Le Portel, France. The team currently plays in the Pro A, the first tier in France.

History
In the 2014–15 season, ESSM had a historic run to the Coupe de France Final. They beat Pro A teams Le Mans, Le Havre, ASVEL and reigning French champion Limoges CSP to qualify for their first cup final ever. In the Final they lost 74–87 to SIG Strasbourg.

In the 2015–16 season, Le Portel won the Pro B play-offs which gained the team promotion to the LNB Pro A. In the first Pro A season of the club, they reached the playoffs after they captured the eight-seed. In the following 2017–18 season, Le Portel made its European debut in the FIBA Europe Cup. In this competition, the team reached the quarter-finals, where it lost to Bakken Bears.

Arenas

Georges Carpentier (2003–2007)
Salle Damrémont (2007–2013)
Lycée Giraux-Sannier (2013–2015)
Le Chaudron (2015–present)

Honours
Coupe de France:
Runners-up (1): 2014–15

European record

Season by season

 Cancelled due to the COVID-19 pandemic in Europe.

Players

Current roster

Depth chart

Notable players

References

External links
Official website

Basketball teams in France